Year 1461 (MCDLXI) was a common year starting on Thursday (link will display the full calendar) of the Julian calendar.

Events 
 January–December 
 February 2 – Battle of Mortimer's Cross: Yorkist troops led by Edward, Duke of York defeat Lancastrians under Owen Tudor and his son Jasper Tudor, Earl of Pembroke, in Wales.
 February 17 – Second Battle of St Albans, England: The Earl of Warwick's army is defeated by a Lancastrian force under Queen Margaret, who recovers control for her husband.
 March 4 – The Duke of York seizes London, and proclaims himself King Edward IV of England.
 March 5 – Wars of the Roses: Henry VI of England is deposed by Edward, Duke of York.
 March 29 – Battle of Towton: Edward IV defeats Queen Margaret, to make good his claim to the English throne (thought to be the bloodiest battle ever fought in England).
 July 10 – Stephen Tomašević becomes the last King of Bosnia, on the death of his father Stephen Thomas; he is crowned on November 17, in Saint Mary's Church, Jajce.
 June 28 – Edward, Richard of York's son, is crowned as Edward IV, King of England (reigns until 1483).
 July – Byzantine general Graitzas Palaiologos honourably surrenders Salmeniko Castle, the last garrison of the Despotate of the Morea, to invading forces of the Ottoman Empire, after a year-long siege.
 July 22 – Louis XI of France succeeds Charles VII of France as king (reigns until 1483).
 August 7 – The Ming Dynasty Chinese military general Cao Qin stages a coup against the Tianshun Emperor; after setting fire to the eastern and western gates of the Imperial City, Beijing (which are doused by pouring rains during the day-long uprising), Cao Qin finds himself hemmed in on all sides by imperial forces, loses three of his own brothers in the fight, and instead of facing execution, he flees to his home in the city, and commits suicide by jumping down a well located within his walled compound.
 August 15 – The Empire of Trebizond, the last major Romano-Greek outpost, falls to the Ottoman Empire under Mehmed II, after a 21-day siege.
 November 27 – 1461 L'Aquila earthquake. A severe earthquake occurs in L'Aquila.

 Date unknown 
 Cirencester Grammar School is founded in southwest England by the Bishop of Durham.
 Leonardo da Vinci and Sandro Botticelli become students of Verrocchio.
 Sarajevo, capital of Bosnia and Herzegovina, is founded by the Ottomans.
 François Villon writes Le Grand Testament.

Births 
 February 6 – Džore Držić, Croatian poet and playwright (d. 1501)
 February 19 – Domenico Grimani, Italian nobleman (d. 1523)
 March 11 – Diego Hurtado de Mendoza, 3rd Duke of the Infantado, Spanish noble (d. 1531)
 April 3 – Anne of France, French princess regent, eldest daughter of Louis XI of France and Charlotte of Savoy (d. 1522)
 May 3 – Raffaele Riario, Italian cardinal (d. 1521)
 May 25 – Zanobi Acciaioli, librarian of the Vatican (d. 1519)
 August 5 – Alexander Jagiellon, King of Poland (d. 1506)
 September 15 – Jacopo Salviati, Italian politician and son-in-law of Lorenzo de' Medici (d. 1533)
 October 1 – Amalie of Brandenburg, Countess Palatine and Duchess of Zweibruecken and Veldenz (d. 1481)
 December 28 – Louise of Savoy, Nun (d. 1503)
 date unknown
 Alessandro Alessandri, Italian jurist (d. 1523)
 Bohuslav Hasištejnský z Lobkovic, Bohemian nobleman (d. 1510)
 Nicholas West, English bishop and diplomat (d. 1533)

Deaths 
 February 2 – Owen Tudor, Welsh founder of the Tudor dynasty (executed)
 March 28 – John Clifford, 9th Baron de Clifford (in battle)
 March 29
 Henry Percy, 3rd Earl of Northumberland (in battle) (b. 1421)
 Lionel de Welles, 6th Baron Welles
 April 8 – Georg von Peuerbach, Austrian astronomer (b. 1423)
 May 15 – Domenico Veneziano, Italian painter (b. c. 1410)
 July 22 – King Charles VII of France (b. 1403)
 September 21 – Sophia of Halshany, queen consort of Poland (b. 1405)
 September 23 – Charles, Prince of Viana, King of Navarre (b. 1421)
 October 7 – Jean Poton de Xaintrailles, follower of Joan of Arc (b. c. 1390)
 November 6 – John de Mowbray, 3rd Duke of Norfolk (b. 1415)
 probable – Jonah, Metropolitan of Moscow

References